Charitodoron agulhasensis is a rare species of sea snail, a marine gastropod mollusk in the family Charitodoronidae, the miters or miter snails. Its shells are available for sale. It originates from southern regions of the globe such as South Africa and Australia.

Description
About an inch long shell similar to a conch with loops going around it. Usually white/brown in color.

Distribution
Mostly found around South Africa's Agulhas Bay. This is also the origin of its taxonomic name.

References

External links
https://bie.ala.org.au/species/NZOR-6-123625#names 
http://www.gastropods.com/2/Shell_10412.shtml

Charitodoronidae
Gastropods described in 1925